Hiram McCullough (September 26, 1813 – March 4, 1885) was a U.S. Congressman from Maryland who served two terms from 1865 to 1869. McCullough served in the Maryland Senate from 1845 to 1851. He also served in the Maryland House of Delegates from 1880 to 1881 and served as the Speaker of the Maryland House of Delegates in 1880.

Biography
Born near Elkton, Maryland, McCullough pursued an academic course at Elkton Academy and later studied law.  He was admitted to the bar in 1837, commencing practice in Elkton.  He served in the Maryland Senate from 1845 until 1851, and was an unsuccessful candidate in 1850 for election to the Thirty-second Congress.  In 1850, he was appointed one of the codifiers of the laws of Maryland.

In 1864, McCullough was elected as a Democrat to the Thirty-ninth and Fortieth Congresses, serving Maryland's 1st Congressional district from March 4, 1865, until March 3, 1869.  He resumed the practice of law and was for many years counsel for the Philadelphia, Wilmington and Baltimore Railroad.  He was a delegate to the Democratic National Convention in 1864 and 1868, and later served as a member of the Maryland House of Delegates in 1880 and 1881.  He was elected Speaker of the House in 1880.  He died in Elkton in 1885, and was interred in Presbyterian Cemetery.

References

1813 births
1885 deaths
People from Elkton, Maryland
Democratic Party Maryland state senators
Speakers of the Maryland House of Delegates
Democratic Party members of the United States House of Representatives from Maryland
19th-century American politicians